Paul Christian Makonda  (born 15 February 1982) is the Former Regional Commissioner of Dar es Salaam, Tanzania.

He gained popularity during a constitutional amendment referendum, where he was among a few  members of a special parliamentary session, commissioned with the task of  preparing a draft for a new Constitution. 
He would later gain popularity in Tanzania's politics, first acting as the District commissioner for Kinondoni before being appointed regional commissioner by the late  President of the United Republic of Tanzania, John Pombe Magufuli, in March 2016.

Makonda was a controversial politician in the Dar es salaam's  politics, often accused of oppressing  the opposition through malicious means such as accusing them of involvement in the drug business  and in later  days staging a war against the LGBTQ community in Dar es Salaam. During the COVID-19 pandemic in Tanzania, President John Magufuli and Makonda believed the disease had been defeated by national prayer without further investigation on the number of cases existing in Tanzania.

Public designation 
In a press statement issued by U.S. Secretary of State Mike Pompeo on 31 January 2020, Makonda was assigned a public designation and barred from entering the United States due to "his involvement in gross violations of human rights, which include the flagrant denial of the right to life, liberty, or the security of persons". The statement also stated that the US had credible information that Makonda was "implicated in oppression of the political opposition, crackdowns on freedom of expression and association, and the targeting of marginalized individuals". The designation also applied to this wife, Mary Felix Massenge.

References

External links
Paul Makonda ni nani? - article on Raia Mwema of 16.02.2017 about his biography (Swahili)

Living people
Tanzanian politicians
People from Dar es Salaam
Anti-prostitution activists
1982 births